Elfriede Knauer (née Overhoff; 3 July 1926 — 7 June 2010) was a German Classicist and Ancient historian specialising in Greek vase painting, the survival of classical themes in Renaissance art, the history of cartography, classical influences on Central and East Asian art, and the Silk Road.

Career
Knauer gained her PhD in 1951 on the subject of pre-Christian apsidal buildings in Greece and Italy from the Goethe University Frankfurt. It was supervised by Guido Kaschnitz von Weinberg. Elfriede, along with her husband Georg Nicolaus Knauer (a noted philologist) lived in West Berlin between 1954 and 1975; she worked as an assistant in the department of Greek and Roman Antiquities of the State Museums. The Knauers travelled widely together, particularly to the United States and in the Mediterranean countries. The Knauers both joined the University of Pennsylvania in early 1975, though rules at the time prevented husbands and wives from lecturing together — Elfriede was thus able to lecture only twice for the Department of the History of Art, in 1979 and 1981. This obstacle, however, has been cited as an important factor in allowing Elfriede nearly unlimited time for research and writing and contributed significantly to her substantial publication record. At the time of her death, Elfried had written seventy-six books and articles. She was eventually appointed Research Associate in the Mediterranean Section at the Penn Museum and latterly served as a Consulting Scholar. In 1994, she was a visiting research fellow in classical archaeology and art history at the American Academy in Rome and was elected as a member of the American Philosophical Society in 1999. In 2002, she received the Director's Award for distinguished service to the Penn Museum.

Following her death, her archive of academic papers and photographs was donated to the Classical Art Research Centre at the University of Oxford.

Personal life
Elfriede's grandfather Edmund Kloeppel was a board member of the Bayer company. She has a twin-sister, Sybille (a noted Etruscologist). She married her husband Georg Nicolaus Knauer in 1951.

Selected publications
 Knauer, E. R. 1965. Die Berliner Andokides-Vase. Stuttgart, Reclam Verl. 
 Knauer, E. R. 1976. "Fragments of a cup by the Triptolemos Painter" Greek, Roman and Byzantine studies 17 p. 209-216.
Knauer, E. R. 1998. The camel's load in life and death – iconography and ideology of Chinese pottery figurines from Han to Tang and their relevance to trade along the Silk Routes. Zurich, Akanthus.

See also
Triptolemos Painter

References

External links
Inventory of the Papers of Prof Elfriede Knauer

1929 births
2010 deaths
German women archaeologists
Archaeologists from North Rhine-Westphalia
People from Leverkusen
University of Pennsylvania Museum of Archaeology and Anthropology
Members of the American Philosophical Society